Kenwick Link is a major road in Perth, Western Australia that bypasses Albany Highway in Beckenham and Kenwick. It is part of State Route 30, while the bypassed section of Albany Highway is allocated Alternate State Route 30. The road also provides access to Roe Highway, which does not connect to Albany Highway. It is a controlled-access road for its entire length, with a grade-separated interchange at Roe Highway, and at-grade intersections elsewhere, including traffic lights at Royal Street and both Albany Highway junctions. Main Roads Western Australia maintains and controls all of Kenwick Link, and uses the internal designation Highway H22 Wimbledon–Rupert Street Link.

Kenwick Link was planned as part of the Roe Highway extension towards Fremantle. It was initially built as a single carriageway, and upgraded to a dual carriageway later. It opened on 17 April 1998, ahead of the Roe Highway extensions from Welshpool Road to Kenwick Link (opened 30 November 2002) and from Kenwick Link to Nicholson Road (opened 21 January 2003). Rupert Street was renamed Kenwick Link as part of the project, although a parallel service road in Kenwick is named Rupert Street.

Building the link required demolition of Packer House, a recognised heritage site that was located at 25 Rupert Street, Kenwick. During construction, an artefact of significance to Aboriginal heritage was uncovered: a maparn stone, used by men in a rain-bringing ceremony. The stone is now in the possession of the Dumbartung Aboriginal Corporation at Clontarf Aboriginal College.

References

Roads in Perth, Western Australia
Kenwick, Western Australia